The 15th National Geographic Bee was held in Washington, D.C. on May 21, 2003, sponsored by the National Geographic Society and ING. The final competition was moderated by Jeopardy! host Alex Trebek. The winner was James Williams, a homeschooled student from Vancouver, Washington, who won a $25,000 college scholarship, lifetime membership in the National Geographic Society, and a trip to a Busch Gardens/Sea World Adventure Camp. The 2nd-place winner, Dallas Simons of Martin Luther King Magnet School in Nashville, Tennessee, won a $15,000 scholarship. The 3rd-place winner, Sean Rao of St. Gabriel School in Hubertus, Wisconsin, won a $10,000 scholarship.

References

External links
 National Geographic Bee official website

National Geographic Bee